Burke Heinrich Badenhop (born February 8, 1983) is an American former professional baseball pitcher. He played in Major League Baseball (MLB) for the Florida Marlins, Tampa Bay Rays, Milwaukee Brewers, Boston Red Sox and Cincinnati Reds. Badenhop played college baseball at Bowling Green State University.

Early ball
Badenhop played high school baseball at Perrysburg High School in Perrysburg, Ohio under coach Dave Hall. In college, he was a team member of the Bowling Green Falcons at Bowling Green State University.

Baseball career

Detroit Tigers
Badenhop was originally drafted by the Detroit Tigers.

Florida/Miami Marlins
On December 5, 2007, he was traded to the Florida Marlins (along with Cameron Maybin; Andrew Miller; Eulogio De La Cruz; Mike Rabelo and minor league player, Dallas Trahern) for Miguel Cabrera and Dontrelle Willis. On April 9, 2008, Badenhop made his major league debut against the Washington Nationals. He had a 1-2-3 inning, which included striking out Rob Mackowiak. Badenhop made his first major league pitching start on April 13, 2008, against the Houston Astros.

Badenhop is known by teammates as "The Hopper", a nickname given to him by Marlins manager Fredi González.

On May 16, 2011, Badenhop was a part of one of the more bizarre games in the team's history against the New York Mets, which ended following Badenhop's game-winning RBI single—just his second career hit.  It was the first time that a relief pitcher had given his team the game-winning hit since Micah Owings did it in a 2008 game playing for the Cincinnati Reds.

Tampa Bay Rays

On December 12, 2011, he was traded to the Tampa Bay Rays for Jake Jefferies. Badenhop was used during the 2012 season as a long-relief pitcher and as a ground-ball specialist because of his sinker.

Milwaukee Brewers
On December 1, 2012, Badenhop was traded to the Milwaukee Brewers for Raúl Mondesí Jr. On January 18, 2013, the Brewers announced they had avoided arbitration with Badenhop, signing him to a one-year contract worth $1.55 million.

Boston Red Sox
On November 22, 2013, Badenhop was traded to the Boston Red Sox for LHP prospect Luis Ortega. Badenhop had a solid season for the Red Sox despite not winning any games. In 70 innings, Badenhop put up a 2.29 ERA and allowing only 1 home run. He recorded one save in a 14 inning game against the White Sox on April 16, 2014.

Cincinnati Reds
On February 7, 2015, Badenhop signed a one-year, $1 million contract with the Cincinnati Reds that included a $4 million option for a second year with a $1.5 million buyout.

Texas Rangers
On April 6, 2016, Badenhop signed a minor league deal with the Texas Rangers. He was released on April 19, 2016.

Former big league reliever Burke Badenhop joined the Diamondbacks new baseball operations position, as Nick Piecoro of the Arizona Republic tweets. In his new role, Piecoro writes, Badenhop will perform "acquisition-based pitching analysis/sports science work."

Author
Badenhop is co-author of the book "Financial Planning For Your First Job", published by Coventry House Publishing, where he draws from his business background at Bowling Green State University.

References

External links

1983 births
Living people
Baseball players from Atlanta
Major League Baseball pitchers
Florida Marlins players
Tampa Bay Rays players
Milwaukee Brewers players
Boston Red Sox players
Cincinnati Reds players
Bowling Green Falcons baseball players
Oneonta Tigers players
West Michigan Whitecaps players
Lakeland Flying Tigers players
Erie SeaWolves players
Peoria Saguaros players
Gulf Coast Marlins players
Carolina Mudcats players
New Orleans Zephyrs players
Jupiter Hammerheads players